Michael William Lebron (born August 26, 1958), better known as Lionel, is an American syndicated radio, television and YouTube legal and media analyst. He is known as a leading promoter of the far-right QAnon conspiracy theory.

Early life and education 
Lebron was born and raised in Tampa, Florida, where he attended Jesuit High School. Lebron graduated from the University of South Florida and Stetson University College of Law. After graduating from law school, Lebron worked with the Hillsborough County State Attorney's Office.

Career
Lebron hosted the CourtTV law show Snap Judgment in the late 1990s. Lionel then began appearing on WABC radio in New York. He first appeared as a caller to WFLA in Tampa, Florida, drawing attention to himself by avoiding the given topic of discussion. He was eventually given his own time slot on WFLA before moving to New York City.

Beginning in May 2007, Lebron replaced The Majority Report with Sam Seder on Air America Radio with a daily three-hour talk show. Seder claimed that Lebron's unpopularity with Air America's listeners led to the loss of most of Seder's audience within a year of assuming the timeslot, as well as the loss of two-thirds of the live affiliates and live streaming.

Talkers Magazine included Lebron in its 2010 "Heaviest Hundred" list at number 54 and in its 2013 "Frontier Fifty" list at number 37. In 2015, he won a New York Emmy Award for commentary and editorial writing.

Lebron also appeared in an episode of House of Cards.

He has appeared on the Russian RT network as a legal and political analyst.

Promotion of conspiracy theories
Since losing his show on Air America, Lebron shifted his politics to the right and re-established himself as a right-wing conspiracy theorist for Alex Jones' InfoWars network, where he has used his show to promote conspiracy theories, such as birtherism (false claims that President Barack Obama was not born in the United States) and claims the government is involved in a cover-up of the September 11 attacks (the 9/11 truth movement).

He has promoted the far-right conspiracy theory QAnon. In August 2018, Lebron met with President Donald Trump at the White House and was photographed with Trump. Lebron stated that the two did not talk about QAnon, but said that Trump "knows about" the conspiracy theory. Lebron has regularly hosted Jerome Corsi, a supporter of the birther movement and promoter of QAnon.

References

External links
 
 

1958 births
Living people
American talk radio hosts
Emmy Award winners
Hispanic and Latino American people
Jesuit High School (Tampa) alumni
Radio personalities from Tampa, Florida
Stetson University College of Law alumni
University of South Florida alumni
American conspiracy theorists
Television personalities from Florida
QAnon